Twyford Moors is a hamlet in the civil parish of Colden Common in the City of Winchester district of Hampshire, England.

References

Villages in Hampshire